"Graves" is a song performed by American Christian rapper KB and American contemporary worship musician Brandon Lake. The song was released on October 28, 2022, as the lead single from KB's upcoming album. The song was written by KB, Wesley Smith, and Quinten Coblentz, with Brandon Lake, Chris Brown, and Steven Furtick being credited as songwriters on account of the sampling of the hit song "Graves into Gardens" by Elevation Worship and Lake. Wearethegood handled the production of the single.

The song peaked at number 33 on the US Hot Christian Songs chart published by Billboard.

Background
On October 28, 2022, KB released "Graves" with Brandon Lake, a collaborative track sampling Elevation Worship and Lake's hit single, "Graves into Gardens". The song serves as the lead single from KB's upcoming album, with its music video premiering on BET Gospel. KB spoke of the song, saying ""Graves" celebrates the God who does more than make bad good but He makes the dead life. What it means to follow Jesus, is to believe in a resurrected existence that can spring forth out of the most difficult & desperate situations. God loves to bring gardens from graves and life from death."

Critical reception
Joshua Galla of NewReleaseToday wrote his opinion of the song, saying "Like most of KB's lyrical skills, the metaphors and wordplay included are some of his best on display. The Lara Croft and Rick Flair references are elite. The production attributes are worthy of their own praise. The overall energy infusing worship and hip-hop never get old."

Composition

Commercial performance
"Graves" debuted at No. 33 on the US Hot Christian Songs chart dated November 12, 2022, concurrently charting at No. 24 on the Christian Digital Song Sales chart.

Music videos
The official music video of "Graves" was published on YouTube by KB on October 28, 2022. The music video was directed by Juan Garcia and produced by Jayson Palacio. It showcases KB performing the song in a dark room with screens showing lyrics to the song and smoke on the floor resembling clouds.

The official acoustic video of "Graves" was published on YouTube by KB on December 2, 2022. The video shows KB and Lake performing the song.

Track listing

Charts

Release history

References

External links
 

2022 singles
Brandon Lake songs
2022 songs
Songs written by Brandon Lake
Songs written by Steven Furtick